Illiopolis is a village in Sangamon County, Illinois, United States. The population was 891 at the 2010 census. It is part of the Springfield, Illinois Metropolitan Statistical Area.

History
The name was formed from Illinois and -polis, a Greek suffix meaning "city".

Geography
Illiopolis is located at  (39.851351, -89.247131).

Demographics

As of the census estimates of 2011, there were 897 people, 362 households, and 263 families residing in the village. The racial makeup of the village was 98.91% White, 0.22% Native American, and 0.87% from two or more races. Hispanic or Latino of any race were 0.11% of the population.

There were 362 households, out of which 34.3% had children under the age of 18 living with them, 58.3% were married couples living together, 8.8% had a female householder with no husband present, and 27.3% were non-families. 23.2% of all households were made up of individuals, and 9.4% had someone living alone who was 65 years of age or older. The average household size was 2.53 and the average family size was 2.99.

In the village, the population was spread out, with 25.4% under the age of 18, 9.1% from 18 to 24, 30.1% from 25 to 44, 23.9% from 45 to 64, and 11.5% who were 65 years of age or older. The median age was 37 years. For every 100 females, there were 96.1 males. For every 100 females age 18 and over, there were 99.7 males.

The median income for a household in the village was $46,442, and the median income for a family was $52,898. Males had a median income of $36,250 versus $26,786 for females. The per capita income for the village was $19,473. About 2.7% of families and 3.0% of the population were below the poverty line, including 3.6% of those under age 18 and 6.4% of those age 65 or over.

Notable people 

 Ray Demmitt, outfielder for the New York Highlanders, St. Louis Browns, Chicago White Sox and Detroit Tigers
 Eric Weaver, pitcher for the Los Angeles Dodgers, Seattle Mariners and Los Angeles Angels

Formosa Plastics

Borden, Inc constructed a PVC plant west of Illiopolis in 1962 in the industrial area that had been the Sangamon Ordnance Plant. It operated the plant until 1987 when it transferred to Borden Chemicals and Plastics Operating Limited Partnership. Following that company's bankruptcy, the facility was purchased by Formosa Plastics Corporation in 2002. On April 24, 2004, the Formosa Plastics plant (formerly Borden) in Illiopolis exploded, killing five people, injuring others and causing a portion of the town to be evacuated. The fire burned for several days and the plant had not reopened as of 2007. On March 6, 2007, the United States Chemical Safety Board (CSB) released its final report on the incident indicating that an operator bypassed a safety interlock and drained a pressurized reactor instead of an empty one they were in the process of cleaning. The report listed as root causes, that Formosa-IL and Borden Chemical "did not adequately address the potential for human error.

See also
Sangamon Ordnance Plant

References

Villages in Sangamon County, Illinois
Villages in Illinois
Springfield metropolitan area, Illinois